Rebecca Judd (née Twigley, born 27 January 1983) is an Australian model, television presenter, speech pathologist and the wife of former Australian Football League player Chris Judd. She has previously been host of Victorian-based travel program Postcards and was weekend weather presenter on Nine News Melbourne.

Career
In September 2004, Judd received considerable media attention due to her wearing a revealing red Tarvydas dress to the Brownlow Medal presentation. The dress was custom-made by Perth designer Ruth Tarvydas and was valued at A$2000. Although Chris Judd, at that time her boyfriend, won the Brownlow Medal, much of the media attention focused on Judd's dress and WAG status. 

Following the Brownlow presentation, Judd received a number of offers from Australian television networks. Her first television role was as a guest presenter on Nine Perth program Just Add Water. Judd also presented a news report about Melbourne Cup fashion for Seven News in October 2006.

The following year, Judd started presenting the weekend weather for Seven News in Perth. Her presenting role drew criticism from some public, who complained that she looked anorexic. She spoke out against the claims, saying that she had never suffered from an eating disorder and she believed the fuss was due to her relationship with Chris Judd. Seven News director Shaun Menegola said it was a shame Judd had been attacked by some viewers and explained that her tall stature meant she looked thinner on camera.

In 2011, Judd joined the Nine Network as host of Victorian-based travel program Postcards and continued in the role until 2020.

In the second quarter of 2013, she filled in for Livinia Nixon presenting the weather on Nine Afternoon News and Nine News Melbourne whilst Nixon was on maternity leave with her second child.

The Judd's purchased Jaggad activewear with Steven and Michelle Greene in 2013, transforming the brand from a triathlon brand to a stylish sports brand. In 2020, the brand was accused of copying designs by Australian brand Nagnata, of which Jaggad has denied.

Judd launched her fashion and lifestyle blog, Rebecca Judd Loves (RJL) in 2012.

In April 2014, Judd was appointed weekend weather presenter on Nine News Melbourne.

In May 2014, Judd designed a capsule fashion collection with Australian fashion brand Skin and Threads, and launched a webTV series called The Style School about home renovation and interior design.

Working on Nine News, Judd was put in an awkward position in 2016 when colleague Tony Jones tried to kiss Judd as a maternity leave farewell live on air. In November 2016, Judd resigned from Nine News Melbourne to spend more time with her family.

In January 2017, Judd joined the KIIS Network to host the 3PM Pick-Up along with Katie "Monty" Dimond and Yumi Stynes.

In 2018 Judd released her first book called "The Baby Bible" about pregnancy and motherhood.

Judd created controversy during the 2020 Melbourne COVID-19 pandemic lockdown by wearing a "Free Melbourne" t-shirt on her Instagram and criticising Victorian Premier Dan Andrews for Melbourne's lockdown measures, calling him "Dictator Dan".

In November 2020, Judd announced she would not be returning to the 3pm Pick-up in 2021, citing she wanted to take a break from the media and focus on her four children and husband Chris Judd.

Judd is an ambassador for Myer and for brands such as Klorane, Chadstone The Fashion Capital, Adairs and The Skincare Company.

Personal life
In September 2007, Judd announced that she would be moving to Melbourne with then boyfriend Chris Judd. She completed her studies in speech and language pathology at La Trobe University in 2008 and worked in adult rehabilitation at the Alfred Hospital.

On 31 December 2010, Judd (née Twigley) married Chris Judd at Melbourne's Carousel at Albert Park. They have a son born in 2011, a daughter born in 2014, and twin boys born in 2016.

Judd lives in a $7.3 Million Spanish Colonial house in Brighton, that the family renovated extensively. In 2019, Judd showcased the expansive re-design on her Instagram with all suppliers credited and the renovation was featured on 9Honey.

Judd has courted controversy in recent times for claiming Brighton has a significant crime problem.

References

External links

 

1983 births
Living people
Female models from Western Australia
Models from Perth, Western Australia
La Trobe University alumni
Speech and language pathologists
Australian fashion designers
Australian women fashion designers
Models from Melbourne
People educated at Kent Street Senior High School